Silcox station is a flag stop station in Silcox, Manitoba, Canada.  The stop is served by Via Rail's Winnipeg – Churchill train.

Footnotes

External links 
Via Rail Station Information

Via Rail stations in Manitoba